Del Ponte is a surname. It belongs to an Italian noble family, hailing from Rome and Naples. 

Notable people with this surname include:
 Ajla Del Ponte (born 1996), Swiss sprinter
 Amalia Del Ponte (born 1936), Italian artist and designer
 Carla Del Ponte (born 1947), Swiss lawyer and former Chief Prosecutor of two United Nations international criminal law tribunals

References 

Italian-language surnames